Shannon Curry is the Principal Investigator of the NASA Mars Scout mission MAVEN. She is a planetary physicist and the Deputy Assistant Director of Planetary Science at the Space Sciences Laboratory at the University of California, Berkeley.

Education 
Curry received her Bachelors of Science from Tufts University in Astrophysics. Following, she received a fellowship through NASA's Graduate Student Researchers Program (GSRP) and completed her Ph.D at the University of Michigan in 2013; her thesis was titled "Test Particle Analysis of High Altitude Ion Transport and Escape on Mars".

Research and career 
Curry's research focus is on terrestrial planetary atmospheres, primarily in atmospheric escape and dynamics at Mars, Venus and other weakly magnetized bodies.

She is involved in instrument development and mission concept development for future flight exploration of the solar system. Her research uses statistics, applied mathematics, modeling and machine learning in order to better understand spacecraft observations of the solar system. Before completing her Ph.D., she was a systems engineer at Lockheed Martin.

In 2020, Curry participated in two Planetary Mission Concept Studies as part of NASA's preparations for the 2023 Planetary Science Decadal Survey: MOSAIC (a mission concept at Mars) and the Venus Flagship Mission Concept.

Curry also leads the science campaigns for the Venus gravity assists performed by the Parker Solar Probe spacecraft.

She is the Project Scientist on the Phase-A/B SIMPLEX mission ESCAPADE and a collaborator on NASA’s Nexus for Exoplanet System Science (NExSS) program.

On August 31, she became the Principal Investigator of NASA's MAVEN mission.

References

External links

NASA astrophysicists
Year of birth missing (living people)
Living people
University of California, Berkeley faculty
Planetary scientists
Tufts University alumni
University of Michigan alumni
American women scientists
21st-century American women